Wawrzyniec z Raciborza (1381–1448) was an Upper Silesian theologian, active in Kraków, Poland.

1381 births
1448 deaths
People from Racibórz
Polish Roman Catholic theologians